The following outline is provided as an overview of and topical guide to autism:

Autism – neurodevelopmental disorder that affects social interaction and communication, and involves restricted and repetitive behavior.

What type of thing is autism? 

Autism can be described as all of the following:
 Disability – may be physical, cognitive, mental, sensory, emotional, developmental or some combination of these.
 Developmental disability – a term used in the United States and Canada to describe lifelong disabilities attributable to mental or physical impairments, manifested prior to age 18.
 Disorder –
 Developmental disorder – occur at some stage in a child's development, often slowing the development.
 Neurodevelopmental disorder – or disorder of neural development, is an impairment of the growth and development of the brain or central nervous system.

Signs of autism
Signs of autism are highly variable. Different individuals will have a different mix of traits. Here are some of the more common signs:
 Avoidance of eye contact – preference to avoid eye contact and feelings of fear or being overwhelmed when looking into someone's eyes
 Developmental delay – slower acquisition of life skills
 Emotional dysregulation – mood swings, including outbursts when overwhelmed
 Executive dysfunction – difficulty staying organized, initiating tasks, and/or controlling impulses
 Routines – need for routine and fear of unexpected change
 Sensory processing disorder – over- or under-responsiveness to sensory input
 Sincerity – tendency to tell the truth
 Special interests – narrow and passionate areas of interest
 Stimming – repetitive movements or sounds that stimulate the senses and regulate emotion and sensory processing

Conditions and research areas

Conditions
 Asperger syndrome – a form of autism often applied to people with a higher IQ who can have a less difficult time communicating with others and understanding concepts or phrases than other individuals with more severe autism. As of 2013, it is no longer a diagnosis on its own. Instead, patients are diagnosed with Autism Spectrum Disorder, which encompasses Asperger syndrome. Many people still use Asperger's as a term when referring to "high-functioning" individuals with autism, but it is not an official diagnosis.
 Autism – a developmental disability present from birth resulting in social difficulties, communication differences, and restricted and repetitive behavior.
 Autism spectrum – a range of conditions classified as pervasive developmental disorders in the Diagnostic and Statistical Manual of Mental Disorders (DSM).
 Childhood disintegrative disorder (CDD) – a condition in which a child experiences developmental regression.
 Conditions comorbid to autism spectrum disorders – such as fragile X syndrome and epilepsy.
 Developmental disability – lifelong disabilities attributable to mental or physical impairments, manifested prior to age 18.
 Fragile X syndrome (FXS) – Martin-Bell syndrome, or Escalante's syndrome (more commonly used in South American countries), is a genetic syndrome that is the most common known single-gene cause of autism and the most common inherited cause of intellectual disability among boys.
 Isodicentric 15 – a genetic variation involving extra genetic material in chromosome 15.
 Language delay – slow development of language abilities compared to the usual developmental timetable.
 Learning disability – a classification including several areas of functioning in which a person has difficulty learning in a typical manner, usually caused by an unknown factor or factors.
 Pervasive developmental disorder (PDD) – as opposed to specific developmental disorders (SDD), refers to a group of five disorders characterized by delays in the development of multiple basic functions including socialization and communication.
 PDD-NOS – (PDD-NOS) is a pervasive developmental disorder (PDD), and is also considered one of the three autism spectrum disorders (ASD).
 Rett syndrome – a neurodevelopmental disorder of the grey matter of the brain that almost exclusively affects females, previously considered to be a form of autism.

Assessment tools
 Autism Diagnostic Observation Schedule – an instrument for diagnosing and assessing Autism.
 Autism Spectrum Quotient – AQ, is a questionnaire published in 2001 by Simon Baron-Cohen and his colleagues at the Autism Research Centre in Cambridge, UK.

Research areas and subjects
 Epidemiology of autism – the study of factors affecting autism spectrum disorders (ASD).
 Epigenetics of autism – the study of epigenetic effects in ASD.
 Mirror neuron – a neuron that fires both when an animal acts and when the animal observes the same action performed by another.
 Spindle neuron – also called von Economo neurons (VENs), are a specific class of neurons that are characterized by a large spindle-shaped soma, gradually tapering into a single apical axon in one direction, with only a single dendrite facing opposite.
 Weak central coherence theory (WCC) – also called the central coherence theory (CC), suggests that a specific perceptual-cognitive style, loosely described as a limited ability to understand context or to "see the big picture", underlies the central disturbance in autism and related autism spectrum disorders.

Controversies
Controversies in autism
 Applied behavior analysis – a therapy that some have argued may be potentially abusive or too controlling, especially if the therapist is poorly trained.
 Autism's False Prophets – written by vaccine expert Paul Offit.
 Autism Speaks – the world's largest autism advocacy organization that sponsors autism research and conducts awareness and outreach activities aimed at families, governments, and the public; some have argued that it is exploitative and unkind.
 Controversies in autism – encompass the disagreement over the exact nature of autism, its causes and manifestations.
 Gluten-free, casein-free diet – diet that eliminates dietary intake of gluten and casein.
 Hyperbaric oxygen therapy – the medical use of oxygen at a level higher than atmospheric pressure.
 MMR vaccine and autism – was a case of scientific misconduct which triggered a health scare.
 Mother Warriors – written by New York Times bestselling author Jenny McCarthy.
 Refrigerator mother – an accusing label for mothers of children diagnosed with autism or schizophrenia, now widely understood to be a myth.
 Thiomersal and vaccines – describing discredited claims that vaccines containing the mercury-based preservative thiomersal contribute to the development of autism and other brain development disorders.

Pseudoscience and disproven treatments
 Autistic enterocolitis – other studies have explicitly refuted its existence.
 Craniosacral therapy – (also called CST, also spelled Cranial Sacral bodywork or therapy) is an alternative medicine therapy used by physiotherapists, osteopaths, massage therapists, naturopaths, and chiropractors.
 Chelation therapy – the administration of chelating agents to remove heavy metals from the body. Not effective in autism.
 Facilitated communication – a debunked technique which purports to allow non-verbal autistics to communicate.
 Secretin – a hormone that controls the secretions into the duodenum, and also separately, water homeostasis throughout the body. Ineffective in autism.
 Vaccine controversy – a dispute over the morality, ethics, effectiveness, or safety of vaccinations.

Notable people with autism

 Susan Boyle (b. 1961) was first seen on Britain's Got Talent when she sang "I Dreamed a Dream" from Les Misérables. She has since become a successful singer and has mentioned how alive it makes her feel. She has also stated that her autism diagnosis came as a "relief" to her.
 Michelle Dawson (b. 1961) is a Canadian autism researcher.
 Temple Grandin (b. 1947) is an American doctor of animal science and professor at Colorado State University, bestselling author, and consultant to the livestock industry on animal behavior.
 Anthony Hopkins (b. 1937) is a Welsh actor who is the first openly autistic actor to win an Academy Award.
 Jim Sinclair (activist) is an autism rights activist who wrote the landmark essay "Don't Mourn For Us".
 Greta Thunberg (b. 2003) is a Swedish leading climate change activist.
 Donna Williams (1963–2017) was a best-selling Australian author, artist, singer-songwriter, screenwriter and sculptor diagnosed with autism after being assessed as a psychotic infant in 1965 at age two, tested multiple times for deafness and labeled disturbed throughout childhood, before treatment for gut, immune and sensory perceptual disorders in adulthood.

See also
 Autistic savant – an autistic person with an extraordinary skill in one or more areas.
 List of autistic fictional characters – fictional characters who have been confirmed to be autistic.

Culture
Societal and cultural aspects of autism
 Autism rights movement (ARM) – (a subset of the neurodiversity movement, also known as the anti-cure movement or autistic culture movement) is a social movement that encourages autistic people, their caregivers and society to adopt a position of neurodiversity, accepting autism as a variation in functioning rather than a mental disorder to be cured.
 Autistic art – art created by autistic artists or art which captures or conveys a variety of autistic experiences or demeanor.
 Global perceptions of autism − an overview of the diagnosis, treatment, and experience of autism in developing nations.
 Identity-first language − the practice of using disability-related words as regular adjectives, such as saying "autistic person" rather than "person with autism".
 Neurodiversity – the standpoint that atypical neurological development is a normal human difference that should be accommodated instead of rejected.
 Neurotypical – (or NT) is a term that was coined in the autistic community as a label for non-autistic people who have no brain-related health conditions or disabilities: specifically, neurotypical people have neurological development and states that are consistent with what most people would perceive as normal, particularly with respect to their ability to process linguistic information and social cues.
 Social model of disability – the view that disability is caused by societal failure to accommodate human diversity, rather than by a defect in the individual.
 Societal and cultural aspects of autism – come into play with recognition of autism, approaches to its support services and therapies, and how autism affects how we define personhood.

Legislation
 Autism Act 2009 – campaign which led to the creation of a Private Members Bill.
 Children's Health Act –The children's health act increased research and treatment of health issues, including autism, asthma, and epilepsy, in children.
 Combating Autism Act – an act in the US that authorized funding into autism; it was renamed after controversy.
 Jonathan's Law – an act meant to curtail abuse in care facilities, named in honor of a child who was killed.

Organizations, stakeholder groups and events

Organizations
 Aspies For Freedom (AFF) – a solidarity and campaigning group which aims at raising public awareness of the autism rights movement.
 Autism Awareness Campaign UK – The Autism Awareness Campaign UK were involved in the first United Nations World Autism Awareness Day, declared by the UN General Assembly on Wednesday 2 April 2008 on the recommendation of the State of Qatar.
 Autism Network International – founded and run by autistic people. Parents and professionals are welcome but the focus is on living autistic rather than curing it.
 Autism Resource Centre (Singapore) – non-profit organization to people with autism live meaningful lives.
 Autism Society of America (ASA) – was founded in 1965 by Bernard Rimland, PhD, together with Ruth C.
 Autism Speaks – the world's largest autism advocacy organization that sponsors autism research and conducts awareness and outreach activities aimed at families, governments, and the public.
 Autistic Self Advocacy Network – a nonprofit advocacy organization run by and for individuals on the autism spectrum. ASAN holds that the goal of autism advocacy should be a world in which Autistic people enjoy the same access, rights, and opportunities as all other people, and that Autistic voices should be included in the national conversation about autism.
 Center for Autism and Related Disorders – service provider.
 Generation Rescue – a nonprofit organization that advocates the view that autism and related disorders are primarily caused by environmental factors, particularly vaccines. 
 M.I.N.D. Institute – research and treatment center.
 National Autistic Society (NAS) – a British charity for people with autistic spectrum disorders (ASD), including autism and Asperger Syndrome.
 National Vaccine Information Center (NVIC) – a private non-profit advocacy group which questions the safety and efficacy of commonly used vaccines.
 Sacar (charity) – a charity devoted to helping people with autism.
 TreeHouse – a United Kingdom charity working to improve the quality of life of children diagnosed with autism and their families, and to inform the general public about autism spectrum disorders.
 Wrong Planet – an online community designed for people with autism, people with ADHD, PDDs, and other neurodivergent traits. There are forums and discussions to help neurodivergent people with daily life and the struggles that come with it, such as making friends, general socialization, and tips for going to overwhelming places. (Sometimes referred to by its URL, WrongPlanet.net)

Events
 2000 Simpsonwood CDC conference – was a meeting convened in June 2000 by the Centers for Disease Control and Prevention (CDC), held at the Simpsonwood Methodist retreat and conference center in Norcross, Georgia.
 Autism Sunday – also known as the International Day of Prayer for Autism and Asperger syndrome, is observed annually on the second Sunday of February.
 Autistic Pride Day – a celebration of the neurodiversity of people on the autism spectrum on June 18 each year.
 Autreat – founded by members of ANI, this is a yearly gathering for autistic people along with parents and professionals to meet and share ideas in an autism-friendly environment.

Other
 Children of the Stars – documentary
 Sensory friendly

Therapies, interventions, and potentially effective treatments

Autism therapies
 Applied behavior analysis (ABA) – a science that involves using modern behavioral learning theory to modify behaviors.
 Cognitive behavior therapy – a therapy to help with thought distortions.
 Dialectical behavior therapy – a therapy that works on emotion regulation and social skills, originally developed for people with borderline personality disorder.
 Floortime – a developmental intervention involving meeting a child at their current developmental level, and challenging them to move up the hierarchy of milestones outlined in the DIR Model.
 Gluten-free, casein-free diet – or gluten-free dairy-free diet (GFDF diet) eliminates dietary intake of the naturally occurring proteins gluten (found most often in wheat, barley, rye, and commercially available oats), and casein (found most often in milk and dairy products).
 Hyperbaric oxygen therapy – a potentially risky therapy with unclear evidence of benefit.
 Hug machine – hug box, a squeeze machine, or a squeeze box, is a deep-pressure device designed to calm hyper-sensitive persons, usually autistic people.
 Lovaas technique – a behavior modification technique.
 Pivotal response therapy (PRT) – also referred to as pivotal response treatment or pivotal response training, is a behavioral intervention therapy for autism.
 The P.L.A.Y. Project –
 Relationship Development Intervention (RDI) – a trademarked proprietary treatment program for autism spectrum disorders (ASD), based on the belief that the development of dynamic intelligence is the key to improving the quality of life for individuals with autism.
 Son-Rise – a therapy encouraging adults to connect with autistic children.
 Speech therapy – therapy to improve speaking skills.
 TEACCH – a program that provides quality-of-life services.

Medications and supplements
 Clomipramine – (trademarked as Anafranil) is a tricyclic antidepressant (TCA).
 Fluvoxamine – (brand name Luvox) is an antidepressant which functions as a selective serotonin reuptake inhibitor (SSRI).
 Haloperidol – a typical antipsychotic.
 Risperidone – (Risperdal, and generics) is a second-generation or atypical antipsychotic.
 Vitamin B12 – vitamin B12, also called cobalamin, is a water-soluble vitamin with a key role in the normal functioning of the brain and nervous system, and for the formation of blood.

Considerations
 Ethical challenges to autism treatment – considerations about whether autism treatments could be harmful or inhumane, especially if therapists are physically hurting the person or training them to suppress important coping mechanisms in order to please non-autistic people.

Associated and possibly associated conditions
Conditions comorbid to autism spectrum disorders

These are conditions that people on the autism spectrum may experience more often than is typical.
 Alexithymia – a term coined by psychotherapist Peter Sifneos in 1973 to describe a state of deficiency in understanding, processing, or describing emotions.
 Attention-deficit hyperactivity disorder (ADHD) – a condition with three subtypes: hyperactive, inattentive, and combined.
 Clinical depression – a mental illness involving low mood and fatigue.
 Coeliac disease – spelled celiac disease in North America and often celiac sprue, is an autoimmune disorder of the small intestine that occurs in genetically predisposed people of all ages from middle infancy onward.
 Communication disorder – a speech and language disorder which refers to problems in communication and in related areas such as oral motor function.
 Crohn's disease (MAP) – which causes a similar disease, Johne's disease, in cattle.
 Deafness – or hearing impairment, is a partial or total inability to hear where the ability would usually be expected.
 Developmental coordination disorder – a disorder involving motor skill impairments.
 Dyscalculia – a specific learning disability involving innate difficulty in learning or comprehending arithmetic.
 Dysgraphia – a deficiency in the ability to write primarily in terms of handwriting, but also in terms of coherence.
 Dyslexia – a very broad term defining a learning disability that impairs a person's fluency or comprehension accuracy in being able to read, and which can manifest itself as a difficulty with phonological awareness, phonological decoding, orthographic coding, auditory short-term memory, or rapid naming.
 Echolalia – the automatic repetition of vocalizations made by another person.
 Erotophobia – a term coined by a number of researchers in the late 1970s and early 1980s to describe one pole on a continuum of attitudes and beliefs about sexuality.
 Hyperlexia – the precocious ability to read words without prior training in learning to read typically before the age of 5.
 Inflammatory bowel disease (IBD) – a group of inflammatory conditions of the colon and small intestine.
 Intellectual disability – a generalized disorder appearing before adulthood, characterized by significantly impaired cognitive functioning and deficits in two or more adaptive behaviors.
 Multiple-complex Developmental Disorder –
 Multisystem Developmental Disorder –
 Nonverbal learning disorder – or nonverbal learning disability (NLD or NVLD) is a condition characterized by a significant discrepancy between higher verbal and lower motor, visuo-spatial, and social skills on an IQ test.
 Obsessive Compulsive Disorder – an anxiety disorder characterized by obsessive thoughts and compulsive behavior that temporarily eases anxiety.
 Picture thinking – visual thinking
 Pyroluria –
 Sensory processing disorder – a disorder characterized by a sensory integration deficit.
 Sensory defensiveness – a condition defined as having "a tendency to react negatively or with alarm to sensory input which is generally considered harmless or non-irritating" to neurotypical persons.
 Sensory overload – related to cognitive load in general, is a condition where one or more of the senses are strained and it becomes difficult to focus on the task at hand.
 Social alienation – estrangement, division, or distancing of people from each other, or of people from what is important or meaningful to them, or of a person from their own sense of self.
 Social communication disorder – a condition similar to autism that involves difficulty with written language.
 Tourette syndrome – a disorder characterized by repetitive motor and vocal tics.

See also
 Wikipedia:Notice board for autism-related topics

References

External links

 

 
Disability-related lists
Autism
Autism
Autism
Autism